
Legnica County is a unit of territorial administration and local government (powiat) in Lower Silesian Voivodeship, south-western Poland. It came into being on January 1, 1999, as a result of the Polish local government reforms passed in 1998. Its administrative seat is the city of Legnica, although this city is not part of the county (it forms a separate city county, which is an enclave within Legnica County). The only towns in Legnica County are Chojnów and Prochowice.

As at 2019 the total population of the county is 55,318, out of which the population of Chojnów is 13,355, the population of Prochowice is 3,602, and the rural population is 38,361. The majority of the population is polish but there is a small German minority at 0.02% of the population mostly in Koiszków (Koischkau).

Neighbouring counties
Apart from the city of Legnica, Legnica County is also bordered by Polkowice County and Lubin County to the north, Wołów County and Środa Śląska County to the east, Jawor County to the south, and Złotoryja County and Bolesławiec County to the west.

Administrative division
The county is subdivided into eight gminas (one urban, one urban-rural and six rural). These are listed in the following table, in descending order of population.

References

 
Land counties of Lower Silesian Voivodeship